The 2020–21 South Florida Bulls women's basketball team represented the University of South Florida during the 2020–21 NCAA Division I women's basketball season. The season marked the 48th women's basketball season for USF, the eighth as a member of the American Athletic Conference, and the 21st under head coach Jose Fernandez. The Bulls played their home games at Yuengling Center on the university's Tampa, Florida campus. The 2020–21 team was the first in USF women's basketball history to win a regular season conference championship, doing so on March 2, 2021 with a win against rival Central Florida. Nine days later they beat Central Florida again to win their first ever conference tournament. Despite their 18–3 record being one of the best in the nation and being ranked 19th in the AP Poll at the time of selection, the Bulls were selected as the eighth seed in the Mercado Region of the 2021 NCAA tournament. Their season ended on March 23, 2021 with the Bulls losing to No. 1 seed NC State in the Round of 32.

Previous season 
The Bulls finished the 2019–20 season 18–12, 10–6 in AAC play to finish in fourth place. They entered as the No. 4 seed in the AAC tournament, where they were eliminated by eventual champion UConn in the semifinal. Due to the COVID-19 pandemic, the NCAA tournament was canceled.

Roster

Preseason

AAC preseason media poll 

On October 28, The American released the preseason Poll and other preseason awards. USF was selected as the preseason #1 team in the conference for the first time in program history.

Preseason Awards 

 All-AAC Second Team - Elisa Pinzan

 All-AAC Second Team - Elena Tsineke

Schedule and results

COVID-19 impact 

Due to the ongoing COVID-19 pandemic, the Bulls' schedule is subject to change, including the cancellation or postponement of individual games, the cancellation of the entire season, or games played either with minimal fans or without fans in attendance and just essential personnel.

 The December 19 home game against Houston was postponed to January 9 due to COVID issues with the Cougars
 Both games scheduled against SMU were canceled after the Mustangs canceled their season on December 29
 The January 17 home game against Memphis was canceled due to COVID issues with the Tigers. Memphis refused to travel to Tampa citing non-COVID related health reasons with the team, but played a game three days later without complaints, so The American declared a forfeit win to USF for conference standings purposes.
 The January 20 game at Wichita State was postponed due to COVID issues with the Shockers. The game was never rescheduled.
The January 23 game at East Carolina was postponed due to COVID issues with the Bulls. The game was never rescheduled.
The January 27 home game against Temple was postponed due to COVID issues with the Bulls. The game was never rescheduled.
The January 30 home game against Cincinnati was postponed until February 17 due to COVID issues with the Bulls
The February 7 game at UCF was postponed until March 4 due to COVID issues with both programs

Schedule 

|-
!colspan=12 style=| Regular season
|-

|-
!colspan=12 style=| AAC Tournament
|-

|-
!colspan=12 style=| NCAA tournament
|-

Rankings

Player honors

AAC Player of the Week 

 Elisa Pinzan - Week 2
 Bethy Mununga - Week 6
 Elisa Pinzan - Week 8

AAC Most Improved Player of the Year 

 Elisa Pinzan

AAC Sixth Player of the Year 

 Maria Alvarez

First Team All-AAC 

 Bethy Mununga
 Elena Tsineke

Second Team All-AAC 

 Elisa Pinzan

Third Team All-AAC 

 Sydni Harvey

AAC All-Tournament Team 

 Sydni Harvey
 Elena Tsineke
 Bethy Mununga

AAC Tournament Most Outstanding Player 

 Sydni Harvey

Other honors

AAC Coach of the Year 

 Jose Fernandez

See also 
2020–21 South Florida Bulls men's basketball team

Notes

References 

South Florida Bulls women's basketball seasons
South Florida Bulls
South Florida Bulls women's b
South Florida Bulls women's b
South Florida